James Blake and Todd Martin were the defending champions but lost in the second round to Wayne Arthurs and Paul Hanley.

Bob Bryan and Mike Bryan won in the final 7–5, 7–6(7–5) against Arthurs and Hanley.

Seeds
All eight seeded teams received byes to the second round.

Draw

Final

Top half

Bottom half

External links
 2003 Western & Southern Financial Group Masters Doubles Draw

Doubles